Richard Reader Harris and Reader Harris may refer to:

 Richard Reader Harris (barrister) (1847–1909), English barrister and Pentecostalist
 Richard Reader Harris (Conservative politician) (1913–2009), English MP